Distichiasis, congenital heart defects and mixed peripheral vascular anomalies is a very rare genetic disorder which is characterized by distichiasis, congenital heart defects, and various peripheral vascular abnormalities. Only 5 cases have been described in medical literature.

Etimology 

This disorder was first described in 1985, when Goldstein et al. described 5 patients; a mother and her 4 children, with a combination of distichiasis, congenital heart defects, and vascular abnormalities. The mother, who was 52 years old, had a ventricular septal defect, two of her daughters had patent ductus arteriosus, her oldest son had bradycardia of the sinus, and her youngest son had stress-induced asystole. Other findings found in some of her children were edema (3/5), chronic venous disease (3/5), varicose veins (2/5), and arterial leg disease (1/5).

References 

Genetic diseases and disorders